A.N.T. Farm is an American teen sitcom which originally aired on Disney Channel from May 6, 2011 to March 21, 2014. It first aired on May 6, 2011, as a special one-episode preview and continued as a regular series starting on June 17, 2011. After airing as the preview of the series, the pilot episode "transplANTed" later re-aired after the series finale of The Suite Life on Deck. The series was created by Dan Signer, a former writer and co-executive producer of The Suite Life on Deck and creator of the YTV series Mr. Young. In mid-November 2010, Disney Channel greenlit the series, with production beginning in early 2011. The first promo was released during the premiere of Lemonade Mouth.

The series stars China Anne McClain as Chyna Parks, an 11-year-old musical prodigy who is the newest member in the Advanced Natural Talent (A.N.T.) program, a gifted program at Webster High School in San Francisco that allows gifted middle school students to skip middle school and go immediately to high school. Sierra McCormick, Jake Short, Stefanie Scott, Carlon Jeffery, and Aedin Mincks also star. The series was successful, as it was the most popular series on television among children in the age ranges 6 to 11 and 9 to 13. The A.N.T. Farm soundtrack was released on October 11, 2011 and was successful, spending five weeks on the Billboard kids chart, peaked at number 29 on the US Billboard 200, and peaked at number 2 on the US Top Soundtracks.

Disney+ premiered A.N.T. Farm for streaming on June 26, 2020.

Plot
A.N.T. Farm revolves around Chyna Parks (China Anne McClain), an 11-year-old musical prodigy, who has just become the newest student in the Advanced Natural Talents (A.N.T.) program at Webster High School in San Francisco, California for gifted middle schoolers. On her first day, she meets Gibson (Zach Steel), the goofy counselor and tutor of the A.N.T. Farm, as well as Olive Doyle (Sierra McCormick), a girl with an eidetic memory, and Fletcher Quimby (Jake Short), an artistic genius, but otherwise quite dim, who falls in love with Chyna when they first meet (although the running joke of the show is that no matter how obvious he makes it, she continues to be oblivious to it, or at least ignores it for a very long time). After becoming friends, the three proceed to go on multiple adventures, using their talents to their advantage.

The school's it girl, Lexi Reed (Stefanie Scott), is one of the teenagers who thinks that the A.N.T.s don't belong at Webster High School and views them as little kids. She proceeds to bully Chyna, thinking of her as competition in being the star of the school. Chyna's older brother, Cameron (Carlon Jeffery), attempts to avoid Chyna in high school as much as he can, afraid she will be an embarrassment to him. Lexi's best friend Paisley (Allie DeBerry) and Angus (Aedin Mincks), a computer prodigy who harbors a crush on Olive, are major recurring roles in the series.

The third season takes place at a boarding school called Z-Tech after all of the A.N.T.s are accepted as students. The school is run by a big technology company, Z-Tech, owned by Zoltan Grundy (Dominic Burgess). The series ends with Fletcher winning an arts fellowship in New York City and moving there to follow his dreams.

Characters

Main

China Anne McClain as Chyna Parks, the A.N.T. program's musically gifted member who can sing, dance, and play many instruments including the guitar, piano, violin, trumpet, saxophone, flute, cello, harp, bagpipes, French horn, bugle, theremin, drums, harmonica, keyboard, bassoon, tuba, spoons, and the banjo. She is the leader of the A.N.T.s.
Sierra McCormick as Olive Doyle, an A.N.T. with eidetic memory and great knowledge of many facts which she calls "interesting factoids." 
Jake Short as Fletcher Quimby, an A.N.T. who's an artistic genius. He has a crush on Chyna which is unrequited.
Stefanie Scott as Alexis "Lexi" Reed, Chyna's biggest rival at Webster High School who is vain, self-centered, and considers herself the Queen Bee. In season 3, it is revealed that Lexi is a math prodigy.
Carlon Jeffery as Cameron Parks (main seasons 1–2, guest star season 3), Chyna's older brother with no apparent talents unlike his sister. 
Aedin Mincks as Angus Chestnut (recurring seasons 1–2, main season 3), a computer genius A.N.T., and has an unrequited crush on Olive.

Recurring
Allie DeBerry as Paisley Houndstooth, Lexi's dimwitted best friend. She is also on the cheer squad, even though she does not know how to cheer.
Zach Steel as Gibson (seasons 1–2), the counselor and tutor of the A.N.T. Farm, who is caring and sensitive, but also dimwitted and childlike.
Mindy Sterling as Susan Skidmore, the principal of Webster High School, who uses the A.N.T.s' talents for her own advantage.
Finesse Mitchell as Darryl Parks, the hopelessly overprotective  father of Chyna and Cameron. He loves his daughter dearly all the while neglecting Cameron. He is a "highly decorated" San Francisco police officer.   
Christian Campos as Wacky the Wolf (seasons 1–2), the school mascot. Wacky is good friends with Chyna, Olive and Fletcher.
Elise Neal as Roxanne Parks (season 1), the mom of Chyna and Cameron. She is a children's birthday party entertainer.
Matt Lowe as Hippo (seasons 1–2), a man who went from the music business to the movie business to the restaurant business.
Claire Engler as Violet (seasons 1-2), a new A.N.T. gifted in sports and athletics. She is aggressive as she has an explosive temper.
Dominic Burgess as Zoltan Grundy (season 3), a businessman who is the CEO of Z-Tech and its respective school.
 Zibby Allen as Madame Goo Goo, a pop celebrity, who is a parody of Lady Gaga; and Winter Maddox (season 3), Zoltan Grundy's Vice President of Acquisitions. Winter's catchphrase is saying "What?!" in an exaggerated voice.
Piper Curda as Kennedy Van Buren / Kumiko Hashimoto (season 3), a student at Z-Tech who pretends to be Kennedy, a debate prodigy, but is actually the daughter of Mr. Hashimoto.
 Tom Choi as Mr. Hashimoto (season 3), a Japanese CEO of the Hashimoto Soda Company who first appeared in The Suite Life on Deck. He is behind the sabotage of the Z-phones.

Special guest stars 
Zendaya as Sequoia Jones (season 2), a teen movie star who loves to play her role perfectly by shadowing a person and attempting to steal their identity.
Vanessa Morgan as Jeanne Gossamer / Vanessa (season 2), a model from Canada and Cameron's girlfriend. Cameron misremembers her name as Jeanne Gossamer at first.
Billy Unger as Tasmanian Neville (season 2), an Australian "explorer" who is actually a weakling. Chyna develops a crush on Neville, which makes Fletcher jealous.
 Chris Rock as Himself (season 3), who visits the Z-Tech school to buy a rare animal for his daughter.

Production

Development
Disney Channel announced on November 11, 2010 that they had green-lit the show for production, which began in early 2011. The show was first conceived when Dan Signer, creator of the show, saw China Anne McClain. "The girl had so much confidence. She can nail a joke. She can sing. She can play instruments. It's like China was some sort of child prodigy [...] And that's when it hit me: Why not build a show around a child prodigy? Someone who's got all of this natural talent & ability, but is still challenged when she's sent off to high school at the age of 11?" Signer said in an interview. After the first few episodes of the show were shown, Disney Channel bumped up their order of episodes for the show from 13 episodes to 26 episodes for the first season. On November 30, 2011, it was announced the series was renewed for a second season. On October 2, 2012, it was announced the series was renewed for a third and final season.

Casting
In 2009, China Anne McClain booked the starring role as Janet in the Disney Channel pilot Jack and Janet Save the Planet alongside future co-stars Sierra McCormick and Jake Short. The pilot was not picked up and never aired. After the pilot was not picked up, Dan Signer began creating another show tailor-made for McClain and cast her as the lead. Sierra McCormick was cast after an audition where she continually talked about tigers. Dan Signer stated "And as I heard her continually talking about tigers, I thought 'That's just how Olive would sound,' because Olive is a fast talking, intelligent student whose talent is memory, which is how Sierra got that part." Jake Short was cast after Signer found him to be likable as an artist during his audition. Jake Short was the last of the three core characters to be cast. Caroline Sunshine was originally cast as Lexi and Stefanie Scott as the role of Tinka Hessenheffer in Shake It Up!, but Dan Signer decided that Sunshine would be better as Tinka and Scott as Lexi, so the two switched roles. Sunshine, however, would later guest star in the episode "some enchANTed evening".

Episodes

Special episodes

Broadcast
In Canada, the show had a preview on May 23, 2011, with the premiere on June 24, 2011. In New Zealand, it premiered on August 15, 2011, and in Australia on the same day, as well on Seven Network on May 19, 2012. It previewed on September 16, 2011, and premiered on October 7, 2011, in the UK and Ireland. It was released in South Africa on December 10, 2011.

Songs

U.S. television ratings
The sneak preview of the series garnered 4.4 million viewers on its premiere night, ranked as TV's No. 1 Telecast in Total Day among Tweens 9-14 (441,000/1.8 rating) and was also TV's No. 1 Telecast among Kids 6-11 (544,000/2.2 rating). Its lead-in, the series finale of The Suite Life on Deck, received 4.6 million.

The episode "The PhANTom Locker" was the most watched episode of the series, scoring 4.6 million viewers, until August 5, 2011, when an unnamed episode earned 4.9 million viewers right after the Phineas and Ferb the Movie: Across the 2nd dimension. It did better than its lead-in Wizards of Waverly Place, which earned 4.1 million viewers.

In Australia the episode "transplANTed" delivered 80,000 viewers. In the United Kingdom the same episode had 321,000 viewers, and the episode "participANTs" garnered 240,000 viewers.

Awards and nominations

Global Broadcast

References

External links

 
 
 

2010s American high school television series
2010s American teen sitcoms
2011 American television series debuts
2014 American television series endings
English-language television shows
Disney Channel original programming
Television series about television
2010s American musical comedy television series
Television series about teenagers
Television series about actors
Television series about fictional musicians
American musical television series
Television series created by Dan Signer
Television series by It's a Laugh Productions
Television shows set in San Francisco